, also known by  and his Chinese style name , was a prince of Ryukyu Kingdom.

Prince Ginowan was the fourth son of King Shō Boku. He was also a half-brother of Crown Prince Shō Tetsu and Prince Urasoe Chōō, and a full-brother of Prince Yoshimura Chōgi.

Prince Ginowan was adopted by Gushichan Chōken. Later, he became the tenth head of Oroku Udun.

He was dispatched together with Kōchi Ryōtoku (also known by Ba Kokugi ) in 1790 to celebrate Tokugawa Ienari accede as shōgun of the Tokugawa shogunate. They sailed back in the next year.

Prince Ginowan had no heir, and adopted Shō Kō, the fourth son of Crown Prince Shō Tetsu, as his adopted son. After King Shō Sei died young in 1803, he gave up his fatherhood. Shō Kō was still regarded as a son of Shō Tetsu and was able to ascend the throne. King Shō Kō had a good relationship with him, and gave presents to him at every new year and birthday.

Prince Gonowan served as sessei from 1817 to 1820.

References

1765 births
1827 deaths
Princes of Ryūkyū
Sessei
People of the Ryukyu Kingdom
Ryukyuan people
18th-century Ryukyuan people
19th-century Ryukyuan people